The Muddler Minnow is a popular and versatile artificial fly of the streamer type used in fly fishing and fly tying.

Origin
The Muddler Minnow was originated by Don Gapen of Anoka, Minnesota in 1936, to imitate the slimy sculpin and fool large brook trout in the Nipigon River. Gapen tied the fly by lantern light in his camp, using materials available in his portable kit, after watching First Nations guides capture sculpins and explain to him their importance as forage for the large, piscivorous trout in the Nipigon. Gapen was the son of resort operators Jesse and Sue Gapen who ran the Gateway Lodge Resort on Hungry Jack Lake in what is now the Boundary Waters Canoe Area Wilderness in the 1920s. In 1936, the Gapens opened a second resort, the Chalet Bungalow Lodge, on the Nipigon River in Ontario to be operated by Don. In 1937 Gapen developed this fly to catch Nipigon strain brook trout, Ontario, Canada. The Muddler, as it is informally known by anglers, was popularized by Montana, United States fisherman and fly tier Dan Bailey. It is now a popular pattern worldwide and is likely found in nearly every angler's fly box, in one form or another. On March 14, 2008, a size 4 muddler minnow was used by Dr. Brian Yamamoto of Fairbanks, Alaska to catch a 41.66 lbs., 46 inch-long brown trout in Argentina's Rio Grande.

Imitations
The versatility of the Muddler Minnow stems from this pattern's ability to mimic a variety of aquatic and terrestrial forage, ranging from sculpins, to crayfish to leeches, to grasshoppers, crickets, spent mayflies, emerging green drakes, stonefly nymphs, mice, tadpoles, dace, shiners, chubs, and other "minnows," along with a host of other creatures. Its mottled appearance matches many terrestrial and aquatic lifeforms, enabling it to mimic without imitating.

Construction
There are limitless material and colour variations, however the essence of the Muddler Minnow is a spun deer hair head. While each Muddler may differ in colour or profile, all true Muddlers have a fore-end or body of spun deer hair that is clipped close to the shank to provide a buoyant head. Typically there is an underwing of squirrel hair and a wing of mottled secondary turkey feather. Often the fly body is made of gold/silver Mylar or tinsel wrapped around the hook shank. Marabou may be tied in as a substitute wing for colour and lifelike movement through the water. The head may be weighted or unweighted, according to the style of fishing, the target species and the intended imitation. The muddler has served for the basis of several patterns, including the Spuddler, Muddler Hopper, Mizzoulian Spook, Searcy Muddler, Keel Muddler, and so on, but even in its simplest and original form, it remains a very effective fly.

Besides the traditional deer hair, many Muddlers are tied today with heads made of antelope, spun wool, dubbing, chenille, or other materials. Whether they should properly be called Muddlers is a moot point.

Note that the fly pictured in the top of the article, while typical, is not a traditional Muddler Minnow. The traditional Muddler uses brown mottled turkey quill segments for both tail and wing. It also seems to lack the underwing of gray squirrel tail. As originally tied by Don Gapen (and as still tied by The Gapen Company today), the Muddler Minnow's head was sparse and "raggedy," the head and collar being fashioned from a single clump of deer hair. The dense head featured on most of today's Muddlers was the invention of Dan Bailey, ca. 1950, because Muddlers were mainly used to imitate large grasshoppers out West back in the 1950s,

Target species
Muddler patterns are generally effective when fishing for any freshwater or saltwater species in cold or warm water environments. This pattern is most often used to catch all species of trout, steelhead, Arctic char, large grayling, both Atlantic and Pacific salmon, taimen, lenok, smallmouth and largemouth bass, pike, redfish (red drum), tarpon, and almost anything else that swims.

Fishing the Muddler
Effective retrieval tactics include stripping the floating Muddler across the water surface rhythmically, imparting a "wake", or allowing the Muddler to sink and twitching or pulsating it against or across a river's current. An unweighted Muddler will float and appears as a hopper, moth or struggling mouse. With a tiny piece of split shot in front of it (or an intermediate flyline) the Muddler can be made to swim slowly over weedbeds and shallow gravel bars. With more weight, the Muddler can be stripped wildly in the shallows to imitate and alarmed baitfish, or allowed to settle in deeper water. When weighted—either on the fly itself, with split shot, or a sinking leader or line—the Muddler may be fished right on the bottom to effectively imitate a sculpin. When imitating sculpins, Muddlers must be kept right on the bottom and fished slowly, with occasional fast strips of maybe a foot to a yard, as if trying to escape a predator.

Tied on salmon hooks in sizes 2 to 10, the Muddler (and don't forget the Marabou Muddler) is an excellent fly for Atlantic salmon. It can be fished on the swing, like a typical salmon wet fly or it can be fished in the surface film as a waking fly. Use of the Portland Creek riffle hitch is desirable, but not entirely necessary, to effectively wake a Muddler. Muddlers tied on salmon double hooks are particularly good waking flies. Know that salmon will often follow the waking fly and will not take until the end of the waking drift. For this reason, it is always a good idea to let the Muddler wobble in the current at the bottom of the drift and twitch it a few times before casting again. (This is also a good technique for trout, especially large trout.)

References

 Peter Gathercole (2003). The fly-tying bible: 100 deadly trout and salmon flies in step-by-step photographs. Aurum Press. 
 Soucie, Gary. Muddler Magic: How to Tie and Fish Muddler Minnows and Other Mostly Muddler Patterns. Frank Amato Publications (in process).
 

Streamer patterns